Wenceslao Alpuche y Gorozica ( – ) was a Mexican poet and politician. 

He studied at a seminary in Mérida but did not become a priest, instead turning to politics and business. He served as a Deputy in the Congress of the Union.

Apluche's work was influenced by Calderón de la Barca, Lope de Vega, Agustín Moreto, and Manuel José Quintana.  Apulche published the poetry collection Año Nuevo ("New Year") in 1837.

References 

1804 births
1884 deaths
Created via preloaddraft
19th-century Mexican poets
19th-century Mexican politicians
Mexican male poets
Members of the Congress of the Union